Trinidad and Tobago competed in the 2010 Commonwealth Games held in Delhi, India, from 3 to 14 October 2010.

Medals

Medalists

See also
 2010 Commonwealth Games

Nations at the 2010 Commonwealth Games
Trinidad and Tobago at the Commonwealth Games
2010 in Trinidad and Tobago sport